Tongariro may refer to these features in New Zealand:

Mount Tongariro
Tongariro (New Zealand electorate)
Tongariro (village)
Tongariro National Park
Tongariro River